Joy Ebinemiere Bokiri (born 29 December 1998) is a Nigerian footballer who plays as a midfielder for French Division 2 Féminine club AS Saint-Étienne and the Nigeria women's national team.

Playing career

Club
Bokiri was a member of Bayelsa Queens in the Nigeria Women Premier League. She previously played for Sporting de Huelva in Spain, and Elpides Karditsas in Greece.

Mid October 2019, she moved to Turkey to play in the Turkish Women's First Football League for Konak Belediyespor in Izmir.

International
At national level, Bokiri represented Nigeria at underage competitions, before making her debut for the senior team. At the 2019 WAFU Zone B Women's Cup, Bokiri scored a goal in Nigeria's victory over Niger.

References

External links

1998 births
Living people
Nigerian women's footballers
Women's association football midfielders
Sporting de Huelva players
Elpides Karditsas players
Konak Belediyespor players
Bayelsa Queens F.C. players
Turkish Women's Football Super League players
Nigeria women's international footballers
Nigerian expatriate women's footballers
Nigerian expatriate sportspeople in Spain
Expatriate women's footballers in Spain
Nigerian expatriate sportspeople in Greece
Expatriate women's footballers in Greece
Nigerian expatriate sportspeople in Turkey
Expatriate women's footballers in Turkey